Ruby Star Airways is a Belarusian cargo airline headquartered in Minsk and based at Minsk National Airport.

History

The airline has been fully licensed as an air carrier since 2002 by the State Aviation Committee of Belarus.

Fleet
As of January 2021, Ruby Star Airways operated the following cargo aircraft:

4 Antonov An-12BP
5 Ilyushin Il-76TD
1 Boeing 747-400(BDSF)

References

External links

Official website

Airlines of Belarus
Companies based in Minsk
Belarusian companies established in 2002
Airlines established in 2002